Ricky Lee's Nasaan Ka Nang Kailangan Kita (International title: Waiting for Love / ) is a 2015 Philippine drama revenge television series based on the 1986 film of the same title which was written by Ricky Lee and directed by Mel Chionglo, starring Susan Roces, Hilda Koronel, Snooky Serna, Janice de Belen, Richard Gomez, Aga Muhlach and Eddie Garcia, courtesy of Regal Films. Directed by Jeffery Jeturian, Mervyn Brondial and Cathy Camarillo, it is topbilled by Vina Morales, Denise Laurel, Jane Oineza, Loisa Andalio, Jerome Ponce, Joshua Garcia and Christian Vasquez. The series premiered on ABS-CBN's Kapamilya Gold afternoon block and worldwide on The Filipino Channel from January 19, 2015, to October 16, 2015, replacing Kapamilya Blockbusters and was replaced by Walang Iwanan.

The series was streaming online on YouTube.

Synopsis
In the town of Itogon, Benguet lived a happy family with Dolores, Paciano, and their daughter Cecilia. One day, Paciano decides to work in Manila. He goes back and forth every day to his job, which complicates Dolores and Cecilia. One day, Cecilia awakens and Paciano disappeared. She waits for her father but has never returned.

Cecilia's dream of going to Manila will become true. She and her mother moved to Manila so Cecilia can go to college in order to find her father. Her hopes and dreams shatter when she discovers that her father has another family and that she doesn't have enough money for college. Cecilia and Dolores survived in Manila by selling food in front of a university, where Cecilia meets Leandro, who starts off as her tutor but they eventually fall in love with each other. At their school dance, Cecilia and Leandro go to a dark library and Cecilia gets pregnant. She agrees to marry Leandro for the sake of their child. After the two got married, Dolores later dies from cancer while holding her newborn granddaughter Corrine in her arms.

Many years passed, Cecilia does everything she can for her family; her husband Leandro, and her children Corrine and Bea. Their life is about to change when Leandro meets his new assistant at work, Toni, who eventually falls in love with him. She seduces Leandro in her car and eventually, she gets pregnant, resulting in Leandro losing his job. Cecilia learns about what Leandro had done from Toni's father Florencio, owner of Briones and Company. Cecilia tells Leandro to stay away and live with Toni, and her daughters become heartbroken seeing their father leaving them. Since that very moment, Corrine and Bea vow to patch the broken pieces of their family together.

A few years pass, Corrine attends UDM (Universidad de Monteagudo) for college and meets Ryan, Toni's younger brother. They eventually fall in love and will have a child of their own. However, when Cecilia reconciles with her childhood friend Carlo, the complication with her husband gets more intense. But Leandro still fights for his wife and will not give up on their marriage. Because of Leandro's unconditional love for Cecilia, he and Carlo eventually face each other and the friendship didn't seem to be working.

While dating Ryan, Corrine's childhood friend Joel is still in love with her and is seen as overprotective of her. When Bea admits to being in love with Joel at a dance, Joel is a bit taken aback and Bea flees the dance and eventually to a new student's arms. This complicates Joel and Bea's friendship after Bea stops hanging out with him and leans more toward a new boy in her life than Joel. Joel realizes over time that he is no longer in love with Corrine and loves Bea now, who promises to fight for him. Bea eventually chooses Joel and they begin their relationship.

In the end, when Carlo searches for himself and his life, he goes back to his wife and decides to live with her and his children. Toni and Andrew move to Australia to start brand new. Meanwhile, Corrine labored her baby with Ryan. Although premature, they still loved the baby and accept him. Corrine and Cecilia finally reconcile and the latter welcome the baby to the family. Cecilia and Leandro finally fixed their marriage and reconciled as well. When everything is peaceful and her family is reunited, Cecilia returns to her old hometown where she finally found her long-lost father Paciano, and the family lived happily all together.

Cast and characters

Main cast
 Vina Morales as Cecilia Macaraeg-Natividad
 Denise Laurel as Toni Briones
 Jane Oineza as Corrine M. Natividad-Briones
 Loisa Andalio as Beatriz "Bea" M. Natividad
 Joshua Garcia as Joel Galvez
 Jerome Ponce as Ryan Briones
 Christian Vasquez as Leandro Natividad

Supporting cast
 Aleck Bovick as Chynna "Ching" Galvez
 Christopher Roxas as Nicanor "Kanor" Galvez
 Santino Espiñoza as Andrew B. Natividad
 Maila Gumila as Norma Briones
 Sue Prado as Kristel
 Emmanuelle Vera as Chloe
 Eslove Briones as Omeng

Guest cast
 Johnny Revilla as Florencio Briones
 Wendy Valdez as Imelda
 Jon Lucas as Allan
 Kazel Kinouchi as Phoebe
 Lorenzo Mara as Atty. dela Rosa
 Nina Ricci Alagao as Ms. Quinn
 Chienna Filomeno as Steph
 Christian Bables as Dwayne
 Pauline Palomique as Tess
 Via Carillo as Lianne 
 Jose Sarasola as Mike
 Marx Topacio as UDM Basketball Coach
 Manolo Pedrosa as Alex
 Levi Ignacio as Pancho Macaraeg (Episode 191 & 192)

Special participation
 Richard Yap as Carlo "Caloy" Asuncion
 Dominic Ochoa as young Pancho Macaraeg
 Ina Raymundo as Dolores Buyaao-Macaraeg
 Dexie Daulat as young Cecilia
 Sue Ramirez as teenage Cecilia
 Arron Villaflor as teenage Leandro
 McCoy de Leon as teenage Caloy
 Beauty Gonzalez as teenage Ching
 Arran Sese as teenage Kanor
 Hannah Valenzuela as young Corrine
 Juvy Lyn Bison as young Bea
 Kim Llono as young Joel
 Lance Lucido as young Caloy

Official soundtrack

Production

Casting
It was originally announced to be Oineza's first starring role in a teleserye after her big stint from the recent season of Pinoy Big Brother. In the trade launch trailer, Marco Gumabao was initially part of the cast, but was later moved to Forevermore. He was later replaced by Be Careful with My Heart star Jerome Ponce for the final casting.

Scheduling
Nasaan Ka Nang Kailangan Kita, initially planned to be part of the Primetime Bida evening block, was originally planned to replace the Korean drama Faith. However, the timeslot was later announced as part of Kapamilya Gold afternoon block. The drama was promoted and premiered back-to-back with Oh My G! and FlordeLiza as part of Kapamilya's "Thank You Day" on January 19, 2015.

Ratings

International broadcast

Awards and nominations

See also
List of programs broadcast by ABS-CBN
List of ABS-CBN drama series

References

External links

ABS-CBN drama series
Philippine melodrama television series
2015 Philippine television series debuts
2015 Philippine television series endings
Television shows filmed in the Philippines
Television shows filmed in Taiwan
Live action television shows based on films
Filipino-language television shows